The Men's team time trial of the 2012 UCI Road World Championships cycling event took place on 16 September 2012 in the province of Limburg, Netherlands.

It was the first such event for trade teams, and the first team time trial to be held as a world championship since 1994.

Final classification

References

External links

Men's team time trial
UCI Road World Championships – Men's team time trial
2012 UCI World Tour